European people may refer to:
 Ethnic groups in Europe
 Demographics of Europe
 European emigration
 White people

See also 
 Caucasian (disambiguation)
 European (disambiguation)
 :Category:European diaspora
 :Category:European people